Charles Leslie Drayton (born May 9, 1965) is an American multi-instrumentalist and producer, known primarily as a drummer. Artists he has recorded or performed with include The Cult, Keith Richards, The Rolling Stones, Paul Simon, Neil Young, Miles Davis, Herbie Hancock, Johnny Cash, Chaka Khan, Mariah Carey, Seal, Bob Dylan, Iggy Pop, Janet Jackson, Courtney Love, Michelle Branch, Andrés Calamaro, Hiram Bullock, and many others.

Drayton played with Australian rock band Divinyls from 1991–2008. He married Divinyls frontwoman Chrissy Amphlett on July 27, 1999. Amphlett died on April 21, 2013, after a long battle with breast cancer.

Drayton has a daughter, Everly (born 21 August 2013), with Adria Petty, daughter of Tom Petty.

Early life
Drayton was a child prodigy who first recorded as a drummer at age eight and began touring professionally at fourteen. He was born in Brooklyn, New York City to a musical family: his grandfather, Charles H. "Charlie" Drayton (1919–1953), a bassist, had performed and recorded with many jazz greats, notably Benny Carter, Ben Webster, Billie Holiday, Coleman Hawkins, Woody Herman, Jack Teagarden, Louis Armstrong, and Fletcher Henderson.  His father, Bernard ("Bernie") Drayton, was a prolific studio audio engineer and producer.  Bernard was the audio engineer for John Coltrane's last recording, The Olatunji Concert: The Last Live Recording.

Career highlights
In 1985, Drayton contributed percussion work on the Rolling Stones' album Dirty Work, which led Keith Richards to ask him to become a founding member of his side project X-pensive Winos in 1987. As bassist, Drayton toured and recorded with Richards and the Winos until December 1992, and played on their albums Talk Is Cheap and Main Offender, and the live album and video Live at the Hollywood Palladium, December 15, 1988. Richards describes Drayton as one of his all-time favorite drummers.

Drayton played drums on four tracks of The B-52's 1989 album Cosmic Thing, including the singles "Channel Z" and "Love Shack". However, Zack Alford, who subsequently toured with the group on drums, appeared in the videos for both songs.

Drayton played bass guitar alongside Neil Young on the September 30, 1989 Saturday Night Live performance of "Rockin' in the Free World"

He played bass guitar on The Cult's 1991 album Ceremony.

He played drums on two albums for Australian band Divinyls: 1991's Divinyls and 1996's Underworld (which he also produced), the band's last album before their hiatus in late 1996. In 1999, Drayton married Divinyls' lead singer Chrissy Amphlett and the couple lived in New York City. In 2007, Divinyls reformed and Drayton played drums in their touring band and in their new recording sessions, also producing the band's new album.  Amphlett died of complications from breast cancer and multiple sclerosis on April 21, 2013.

In 2008 and 2009 he recorded and toured with Paul Simon. In 2010 he toured with Simon & Garfunkel. Paul Simon said "Charley's the heart of the band and I'm very grateful that I have him. He comes in prepared, real serious and he’s a delight. He’s an all around great musician and a fine, fine drummer."

He has been recording and touring with Australian rock band Cold Chisel since 2011, following the death of original drummer Steve Prestwich.

Drayton co-produced and played various instruments on Fiona Apple's album The Idler Wheel..., released in June 2012.

In 2014 he played drums on French chart topper Johnny Hallyday's album Rester Vivant.

In 2015 he played drums on Hallyday's album De L'Amour, as well as on the number two charting album Kaze no Hate Made by Japanese artist Kazuyoshi Saito.

In 2017 Drayton played drums on a worldwide tour with Little Steven & The Disciples of Soul.

In November 2021 Drayton joined Bob Dylan & his Band.

Drayton was one of the major critics of Divinyls guitarist Mark McEntee's plans to reform the group with a new singer, stating in an angry Facebook post that McEntee's actions were the "ultimate disrespect" toward Amphlett.

Collaborations
With Feargal Sharkey
 Wish (Virgin Records, 1988)

With Keith Richards
 Talk Is Cheap (Virgin Records, 1988)
 Main Offender (Virgin Records, 1992)

With Divinyls
 Divinyls (Virgin Records, 1991)
 Underworld (Virgin Records, 1996)

With Eddie Money
 Right Here (Columbia Records, 1991)

With Ivan Neville
 Thanks (Iguana Records, 1995)

With Andrés Calamaro
 Alta Suciedad (Gasa, 1997)
 Honestidad Brutal (Gasa, 1999)

With Doyle Bramhall II
 Jellycream (RCA Records, 1999)

With Rosanne Cash
 Black Cadillac (Capitol Records, 2006)

With Marc Cohn
 Join the Parade (Decca Records, 2007)

With Gavin DeGraw
 Free (J Records, 2009)

With Fiona Apple
 The Idler Wheel Is Wiser Than the Driver of the Screw and Whipping Cords Will Serve You More Than Ropes Will Ever Do (Clean Slate Records, 2012)

With Beth Hart
 Better Than Home (Provogue Records, 2015)

References

1965 births
Living people
American session musicians
American rock drummers
American rock bass guitarists
American male bass guitarists
Divinyls members
The Cult members
The Dead Daisies members
American male guitarists
African-American drummers
African-American guitarists
Cold Chisel members
20th-century American drummers
American male drummers
20th-century American guitarists